Northwestern Health Sciences University (NWHSU) is a private university focused on alternative health care and located in Bloomington, Minnesota. The university has educational programs in chiropractic, Traditional Chinese medicine, acupuncture, therapeutic massage, Allied health professions, and human biology. The university was founded in 1941 by John B. Wolfe, DC.

Previously Northwestern College of Chiropractic, Northwestern Health Sciences University has focused on alternative and integrative health care education, patient care, and research for over 70 years. Since 1991, NWHSU's Wolfe-Harris Center for Clinical Studies has become one of the largest natural health care research institutions in the United States.

Organization 

Northwestern Health Sciences University is a private institution, receiving most of its funding through tuition, research grants, and alumni contributions. It offers 11 academic programs: Acupuncture and Chinese Medicine, Chiropractic, Message Therapy, Medical Assisting, Medical Laboratory Science, Medical Laboratory Technology, Nutrition, Post Baccalaureate Pre-Health, Radiation Therapy, Radiologic Technology, and Undergraduate Health Sciences. Northwestern is accredited by the Higher Learning Commission.

Founded in 1941, the College of Chiropractic offers a doctor of chiropractic degree. The college has created a clinical system, with several natural care centers, more than 150 community-based private-practice clinics, and final-term preceptorship opportunities around the world. The university's public clinic system records more than 65,000 patient visits a year, making Northwestern the largest provider of natural health care services in Minnesota.

The College of Acupuncture and Chinese Medicine is the largest and oldest school in Minnesota offering master's degree programs accredited by the Accreditation Commission for Acupuncture and Oriental Medicine. In 1999, the Minnesota Institute of Acupuncture and Herbal Studies, which had been founded by Minnesota acupuncture pioneer, the late Edith R. Davis, merged with NWHSU. The merger created the Minnesota College of Acupuncture and Oriental Medicine, which continued offering a Master of Acupuncture and Master of Oriental Medicine. In April 2020 NWHSU announced the opening of a new college, The College of Acupuncture and Chinese Medicine (CACM).

The School of Massage Therapy is the only massage therapy school in Minnesota to receive accreditation from the Commission on Massage Therapy Accreditation (COMTA). In 2000, NWHSU created the Massage Therapy Program and graduated its first class in the spring of 2002. The 36-semester credit, 780-hour program emphasizes a foundation in the basic sciences, more than 340 hours of hands-on lab experience, and a structured clinical experience within the School of Massage Therapy Teaching Clinic and other community sites. Students receive a professional certificate in massage therapy upon successful completion.

Allied Health Programs and the College of Health and Wellness: In June 2019, NWHSU announced that the Higher Learning Commission approved the transfer of students in the Twin Cities area whose educational plans were interrupted by the sudden closing of Argosy University. The HLC approved to accept students transferring from Argosy in five degree programs including Associate of Applied Science in Medical Assisting, Associate of Applied Science in Radiologic Technology, Associate of Science in Radiation Therapy, Associate of Science in Medical Laboratory Technology, and the Bachelor of Science in Medical Technology. These five new degree programs are now part of NWHSU's curriculum and degree offerings. These important and complementary fields fit well with NWHSU's exclusive focus on health sciences education and expand the university's focus on integrative health care.

Academics
The curriculum for the Doctor of Chinese Medicine program provides about 3,000 hours of didactic and clinical instruction in acupuncture, Chinese herbology, and related studies such as Tui Na, Qigong, introductory Chinese language skills and practice management. The program takes three years of full-time enrollment to complete. The curriculum for the Master of Acupuncture program is similar to that of the Chinese medicine program, but does not include herbal studies. This program includes more than 2,300 hours of instruction, taking two and two-thirds years of full-time enrollment to complete.

The Master of Acupuncture and Doctor of Chinese Medicine programs are offered by the university are accredited by the Accreditation Commission for Acupuncture and Chinese Medicine.

The Doctor of Chiropractic program offered by the university is accredited by the Commission for Accreditation of the Council on Chiropractic education. The full-time day program consists of more than 4,300 credit hours over 10 trimesters. The students may also complete a Bachelor of Science degree in human biology while enrolled in the chiropractic program.

Campus 

Northwestern Health Sciences University is located on a  campus in suburban Bloomington. The  main building was formerly a junior high school, but has since been renovated to accommodate the university containing laboratories, lecture halls, classrooms, a library, a bookstore, three public clinics, an auditorium, a cafeteria, a gymnasium, a research center, and a swimming pool. Construction projects include the addition of the Wolfe-Harris Center for Clinical Studies and the Greenawalt Library. The university is currently constructing a  new academic facility called the Wolfe-Harris Center for Excellence.

Founded on June 2, 1941, with just three students, Northwestern College of Chiropractic was first housed on the sixth floor of the W. T. Grant Department Store on Nicollet Avenue in downtown Minneapolis. The college quickly outgrew the space and relocated in 1949 to 2222 Park Ave. in Minneapolis.

In 1974 Northwestern moved to a former Catholic grade school at 1834 Mississippi Blvd. in St. Paul. Over the next decade, the college continued to grow. By 1983 it had reached capacity and a new building was needed. Thanks to a $500,000 donation from Dan Gainey, a grateful chiropractic patient and owner of Jostens Inc., the college moved to its current site in Bloomington.

Students 

Currently 941 students are taking classes at Northwestern. The chiropractic program has 683 students; the acupuncture and Chinese medicine program has 112, and the massage therapy program 64 students.

Fifty-two percent of students on campus are female. In the acupuncture and Chinese medicine program, 78 percent of students are female; in the chiropractic program, 45 percent, and in the massage therapy program, 88 percent.

Nine percent of students on campus are a minority or non-resident alien. In the acupuncture and Chinese medicine program, 9 percent of students are a minority or non-resident alien; in the chiropractic program, 7.7 percent, and in the massage therapy program, 9 percent.

Currently 56 percent of students are from Minnesota. Other states with a significant number of students attending Northwestern include Wisconsin (13 percent), North Dakota (7.5 percent), South Dakota (5.6 percent), and Iowa (3 percent). A total of 27 states are represented at Northwestern.

The average age of chiropractic students is 25.88. The average age for acupuncture and Chinese medicine students is 31.69. The average age for massage therapy students is 27.54.

Student activities 

Northwestern Health Sciences University has numerous student clubs and organizations, which comprise groups of students who share a common interest, either social or professional. The organizations reflect a wide range of interests, including an array of professional, political, social and recreational groups. Included among these many organizations are networks for international students and women students, opportunities for public speaking and engagement in public affairs, as well as the study of chiropractic methods and philosophy. These organizations provide ready opportunities for participation in these and other special interests, and for personal and professional growth. The university also provides and sponsors extracurricular clubs and activities throughout the year including aerobics, baseball, basketball, soccer, mountain biking, skiing, and martial arts.

Research 

Northwestern Health Sciences University's Wolfe-Harris Center for Clinical Studies, located on the Bloomington campus, houses a natural health care research center. The center's two newest studies, focusing on back-related leg pain and integrative care for low back pain, pushed the university over the $7 million mark in total funding from federal agencies over the institutions entire history (since 1941). In addition, Northwestern Health Sciences University's research efforts are now being expanded to the other academic programs on campus. A limited study was conducted in 2006 in the teaching clinic of the College of Acupuncture and Chinese Medicine, and the Center recently completed a pilot study of massage therapy for tension headaches.

See also

 List of colleges and universities in Minnesota
 Higher education in Minnesota

References

External links 
Official website

Buildings and structures in Bloomington, Minnesota
Chiropractic schools in the United States
Educational institutions established in 1941
Massage therapy
Universities and colleges in Bloomington, Minnesota
1941 establishments in Minnesota
Private universities and colleges in Minnesota